Ivan Matković (born 12 October 1953) is a Croatian retired football manager and former player.

Managerial career
He was the manager of Hajduk Split, Osijek, Cibalia Vinkovci, Zadar and Zagreb in the Croatian First League, as well as of Persepolis in Iran's Premier Football League. He also worked as an assistant to Tomislav Ivić at Turkish giants Fenerbahçe. He was named manager of Slovenian side Publikum Celje in June 2004, after being sacked at fellow Slovenians Primorje Ajdovščina a month earlier.

He also was head of Hajduk's football academy.

Personal life
After ending his career in management, Matković retired to Škrip, the oldest settlement on the island of Brač. He then took up coaching again, being named manager of fifth-tier, local side Jadran in March 2015.

Honours

Manager
Celje
Slovenian Cup: 2004–05

References

External links
 
Profil on TFF.org
https://web.archive.org/web/20090305094103/http://www.zerodic.com/autor/fudbal_1945-1992/igraci/igraci_m.htm

1953 births
Living people
Footballers from Split, Croatia
Association football forwards
Yugoslav footballers
HNK Hajduk Split players
HNK Rijeka players
NK Solin players
Yugoslav First League players
Croatian football managers
NK Zadar managers
HNK Šibenik managers
NK Osijek managers
NK Zagreb managers
Persepolis F.C. managers
HNK Hajduk Split managers
NK Primorje managers
NK Celje managers
NK Kamen Ingrad managers
HNK Cibalia managers
HNK Trogir managers
Croatian Football League managers
Croatian expatriate football managers
Expatriate football managers in Iran
Croatian expatriate sportspeople in Iran
Expatriate football managers in Slovenia
Croatian expatriate sportspeople in Slovenia
Fenerbahçe S.K. (football) non-playing staff